Financial Management for IT Services is a Service Strategy element of the ITIL best practice framework. The aim of this ITIL process area is to give accurate and cost effective stewardship of IT assets and resources used in providing IT Services. It is used to plan, control and recover costs expended in providing the IT Services negotiated and agreed to in a service-level agreement (SLA).

Goal
The goal of Financial Management for IT Services (ITFM) is to optimize the cost of IT Services while taking into account quality and risk factors. The analysis balances cost against quality and risk to create intelligent, metric-based cost optimization strategies. Balancing is required since cost cutting may not be the best strategy to deliver optimum consumer outputs.

ITFM is a discipline based on standard financial and accounting principles, but addresses specific principles that are applicable to IT services, such as fixed asset management, capital management, audit, and depreciation.

For an internal IT organization, the goal is described as:

To provide cost-effective stewardship of the IT assets and resources used in providing IT services

For an outsourced IT organization or an IT organization that is run as if it were a separate entity (i.e., with full charging) the goal may be described as:

To be able to account fully for the spend on IT services and to be able to attribute these costs to the services delivered to the organization's customers and to assist management by providing detailed and costed business cases for proposed changes to IT services

Sub-processes
Financial management for IT services contains 3 sub-processes: budgeting, IT accounting, and charging.

Budgeting
Budgeting enables an organization to plan future IT expenditures, reducing the risk of over-spending and ensuring the revenues are available to cover the predicted spend. Additionally, budgeting allows an organization to compare actual costs with previously predicted costs in order to improve the reliability of budgeting predictions.

IT accounting
IT accounting is concerned with the amount of money spent in providing IT services. It allows an organization to perform various financial analyses to gauge the efficiency of the IT service provision and determine areas where cost savings can be made. It will also provide financial transparency to aid management in the decision making process. Several cost elements can be used to control accounting:

 Capital costs: Any type of purchases that would have a residual value, such as hardware and building infrastructure.
 Operational costs: Day-to-day recurring expenses, such as rental fees, monthly electrical invoices and salaries.
 Direct costs: Any costs that are directly attributed to one single or specific service or customer. A typical example would be the purchase of a dedicated server that cannot be shared and is needed to host a new application for a specific service or customer. 
 Indirect costs: One specific service provision that needs to be distributed among several customers in a fair breakdown. An example is the cost associated with a Local Area Network on which every customer is connected. Breakdown could be done using total number of users per customer or total amount of bandwidth usage per customer to accurately distribute the cost of providing this service.
 Fixed costs: Any expenses established for long periods of time like annual maintenance contracts or a lease contracts. These expenses do not vary in the short-term.
 Variable Costs: Any expenses that vary in the short-term based on the level of services provided, resources consumed, or other factors. For example, energy costs are variable based on the amount consumed.

Charging

Charging provides the ability to assign costs of an IT Service proportionally and fairly to the users of that service. It may be used as a first step towards an IT organization operating as an autonomous business. It may also be used to encourage users to move in a strategically important direction - for example by subsidizing newer systems and imposing additional charges for the use of legacy systems. Transparency of charging will encourage users to avoid expensive activities where slightly more inconvenient but far cheaper alternatives are available. For example, a user might browse a dump on screen rather than printing it off.

Charging is arguably the most complex of the three sub-processes, requiring a large investment of resources and a high degree of care to avoid anomalies, where an individual department may benefit from behavior which is detrimental to the company as a whole. Charging policy needs to be simultaneously simple, fair and realistic.

Charging need not necessarily mean money changing hands (full charging). It may take the form of information passed to management on the cost of provision of IT services (no charging), or may detail what would be charged if full charging were in place without transactions actually being applied to the financial ledgers (notional charging). Notional charging may also be used as a way of piloting full charging.

Related ITIL processes
Several processes in the ITIL model provide information to the financial management for IT process.

Service-level management
Service-level management provides key information regarding the level of service required by the customer (SLAs) and therefore forms the basis for calculations of all three sub-processes. Customers can only be charged for services agreed in the SLAs and based on the service catalog. 

Given that the aim of financial management for IT is the stewardship of IT assets and resources, information from configuration management and in particular from the CMDB should be made available.

Capacity management
Capacity management are charged with planning and controlling the IT capacity requirements of the organisation. Changes in capacity requirements - which usually increase - will inevitably lead to changes in costs. This may mean unit costs will increase because capacity has to be increased in an emergency or it may mean unit costs will drop as a result of purchasing newer technology, economies of scale or increased purchasing power from an external supplier.

Change management
Changes are often linked to costs, so financial management for IT is therefore usually involved in the change management process so that the ongoing analysis of costs can take place. Where changes are frequent, IT financial management may choose either to include anticipated changes in the original cost model or to adjust the cost model once the IT service has stabilized.

Key performance indicators (KPIs)
In order to assess whether financial management for IT services has been successfully deployed, the following key performance indicators may be examined:
 do the predicted budgets match the actual expenditure?
 has user behavior changed to follow the corporate IT goals?
 are charges seen by users and customers to be simple, fair and in line with organisational goals?
 does the IT organization provide the expected level of income/profit?
 does management feel more confident in their ability to predict costs in IT planning?

References 

Information technology management
Financial management